Christian Wurstisen (23 December 1544 – 29 March 1588) was a mathematician, theologician, historian from Basel. His name is also given as Wursteisen, Wurzticius, Ursticius, Urstisius, or Urstis.

Life 

In 1565, he became professor of mathematics at the Basel University, and in 1585 professor of theology. The next year, the city magistrate appointed him to the academy as a town historian, a position he held until his death. He was buried in Münster.

The second edition of Nicolaus Copernicus's De revolutionibus orbium coelestium had been printed in Basel. Wurstisen is credited to have first introduced Copernicus' work to Galileo Galilei, while Galilei's adoption of heliocentrism was often attributed to Michael Maestlin. Christian Wurstisen is mentioned by name in Galileo's Dialogue. This attribution has been challenged, however, and another similarly named man, Christopher Wursteisen, has been credited with introducing Copernicus's theories to Padua.

His mathematical book Elementa arithmeticae was read by John Milton and the Hungarian philosopher Andreas Dudith.

In his chronicle of Basel from 1580, Wurstisen named the heraldic tinctures after the initials of the given colours, a principle called tricking. Painter Gregorius Sickinger (1558-?) from Solothurn illustrated it.<ref>Wurstisen, Christian, 1544-1628. Bassler Chronik darinn alles was in oberen Teutsche Landen/ nicht nur in der Stadt und Bistumbe Basel....,  1. Auflage 1 Band. Basel Henric Petri um 1580 4° 655 Seiten, und vielen Textholzschnitten, Titelholzschnitt von T.Stimmer. Einband in Blindprägedruck der Zeit mit Buchschliessen. Vorsatzpapier eingefügt, einige Seiten hinterlegt, letze Seiten Wurmlöcher. Textholzschnitt und Titelholzschnitt mit Besitzervermerk. Erstausgabe der ersten gedruckten Basler Chronik, komplett mit der seltenen auf drei Teilen abgezogenen Karte von Christian Wursteisen (1544-1588). In zehnjähriger, eifriger und umsichtiger Arbeit wurden die Quellen zusammengetragen von Basler Historiker und Mathematiker Christian Wursteisen.Die Chronik stellt eine grossangelegte Heimatkunde des Raurakerlandes und dessen Nachbargebiete vor und ist ein Höhepunkt schweizerscher Historiographie des 16.Jahrhunderts. Von der Einsicht überzeugt, dass Partikularhistorisches Wissen die Grundlage für Generalhistorien bilden müssen,versucht der Autor, die Ortsgeschichte in Zusammenhang mit der eoropäischen Geschichte darzustellen. Wursteisens Kritik bleibt wach, besonders gegenüber volkskundlicher Überlieferungen, er verfolgt zäh Aberglauben und Teufelsspuk und stellt 
am liebsten auf Urkunden ab. (E.Bonjour).Die grosse aus drei Teilen zusammengesetzte Karte, umrahmt von einer Wappenbordüre, zeigt rechts den Plan der Stadt Basel aus der Vogelschau und in der linken Hälfte das Gebiet des Aar-und Sundgaus, sowie das Elsass und den südlichen Schwarzwald. Die vom Solothurner Maler und Formschneider Gregor Sickinger (1558-?) entworfene und geschnittenen Textillustrationen zeigen historische Ereignisse, Portraits und viele Wappen, bei denen erstmals die entsprechenden Farben und Buchstaben markiert sind.
Wäber 112, Hironimus 552/472b,181a, Lonchamp 3314. </ref>

 Works 

 Wurstisen, Ch.: Bassler Chronick, dariñ alles, was sich in Oberen Teutschë Landen, nicht nur in der Statt und Bistumbe Basel, von ihrem Ursprung her, ... biss in das gegenwirtige MDLXXX. Jar, gedenckwirdigs zugetragen: sonder auch der Eydtgnoschafft, Burgund, Elsass und Breissgow ... warhafftig beschrieben: sampt vieler Herrschafften und Geschlechtern Wapen und Stambäumen, etc. (Eine Missive Enee Sylvii ... darinn die Statt Basel kurtzlich beschrieben. Durch C. Wurstisen ... vertolmetscht.).. pp. xx. 655. Sebastian Henricpetri: Basel, 1580. fol. 
 Wurstisen, Ch. (Urstisius): Elementa arithmeticae, logicis legibus deducta in usum Academiae Basiliensis. Opera et studio Christiani Urstisii. Basileae, 1579. Sebastian Henricpetri.
 Wurstisen, Ch.: Germaniae historicorum illustrium, quorum plerique ab Henrico IIII Imperatore usque ad annum Christi, MDCCCC ... res gestas memoriae consecrarunt, tomus unus [-pars altera], Volume 1, apud heredes Andreae Wecheli, 1585 
 Matthias of Neuenburg, Albert of Straßburg, Johannes Cuspinianus, Christian Wurstisen: Matthiae Neoburgensis Chronica, cum continatione et Vita Berchtholdi de Buchegg: Die Chronik des Matthias von Neuenburg nach der Berner- und Strassburgerhandschrift mit den lesarten der ausgaben von Cuspinian und Urstisius'', Stämpflische Buchdruckerei (G. Hünerwadel), 1866

External links

 
  Wursteisen describing how the Jewish cemetery was razed in 1349, the tombstones were used to build the town wall
  Copy of the Basler Chronik for sale (with photos)

References 

1544 births
1588 deaths
16th-century German mathematicians
16th-century German astronomers
16th-century German historians
German heraldists
16th-century Calvinist and Reformed theologians
German Calvinist and Reformed theologians
16th-century German Protestant theologians
German male non-fiction writers
16th-century German male writers
People from Liestal